Alexander Čejka (born 2 December 1970) is a Czech-German professional golfer.

Čejka was born in Mariánské Lázně, Czechoslovakia. He left the country with his parents as a refugee at the age of nine, eventually settling in Munich, where he lived for many years, becoming a West German citizen. Čejka lives in Las Vegas and also has a home in Prague.

Professional career
Čejka turned professional in 1989 and played on the European Tour from 1992 to 2002. His biggest tournament win was the Turespaña Masters Open de Andalucía at Islantilla Golf Club in 1995. That year he came 6th on the European Tour's Order of Merit. Since 2003 he played mainly on the U.S. based PGA Tour. In 2003 he reached as high as No. 33 in the Official World Golf Ranking.

Čejka took a five-shot lead into the final round of the 2009 Players Championship after rounds of 66, 67 and 72. He shot a 42 on the front nine, however, en route to a 79 and an eight-stroke loss to Henrik Stenson.

He represented Germany in the World Cup 12 times, including in 2011 at Mission Hills Haikou in Hainan Island, teaming with partner Martin Kaymer to tie for second, two strokes behind the winning United States team of Matt Kuchar and Gary Woodland. Čejka teamed with Kaymer in four World Cup appearances.

In 2012 Čejka finished 177th on the PGA Tour and moved to the Web.com Tour. He finished 64th in 2013, then 6th in 2014 to earn a return to the PGA Tour.

Čejka won his first PGA Tour event in his 287th Tour start, the 2015 Puerto Rico Open. Two players bogeyed the 18th hole ensuring a five-man playoff; Čejka won with a birdie at the first playoff hole. He is the first golfer born in the Czech Republic to win a PGA Tour event and first non-American to win the Puerto Rico Open. At the time, he was also the third oldest first-time winner on the PGA Tour since 1970.  

He competed at the 2016 Summer Olympics.

With most of the sports world on hold due to the COVID-19 pandemic, Čejka played on the Arizona-based Outlaw Tour, one of the few professional golf tours in operation during the pandemic, where he won two events.

In May 2021, Čejka won his first tournament on the PGA Tour Champions at the Regions Tradition. Čejka won this major tournament in a playoff over Steve Stricker. Three weeks later, Čejka won his second PGA Tour Champions major tournament of 2021 at the KitchenAid Senior PGA Championship at Southern Hills Country Club in Tulsa, Oklahoma. Čejka shot a  final-round 67 Sunday to beat Tim Petrovic by four shots.

Professional wins (17)

PGA Tour wins (1)

PGA Tour playoff record (1–1)

European Tour wins (4)

Web.com Tour wins (1)

*Note: The 2014 Pacific Rubiales Colombia Championship was shortened to 54 holes due to rain.

Challenge Tour wins (4)

Outlaw Tour wins (2)
2020 Arrowhead Classic, Parker Open

Other wins (2)
1990 Czech Open
1992 Czech Open

PGA Tour Champions wins (2)

PGA Tour Champions playoff record (1–0)

European Senior Tour wins (2)

Results in major championships
Results not in chronological order in 2020.

CUT = missed the half-way cut
WD = withdrew
"T" = tied
NT = No tournament due to COVID-19 pandemic

Summary

Most consecutive cuts made – 4 (twice)
Longest streak of top-10s – 1 (twice)

Results in The Players Championship

CUT = missed the halfway cut
"T" indicates a tie for a place

Results in World Golf Championships

1Cancelled due to 9/11

QF, R16, R32, R64 = Round in which player lost in match play
"T" = Tied
NT = No tournament

Senior major championships

Wins (2)

Results timeline

DQ = disqualified
"T" indicates a tie for a place

Team appearances
Alfred Dunhill Cup (representing Germany): 1994, 1995, 1997, 1998
World Cup (representing Germany): 1995, 1996, 1997, 2000, 2002, 2003, 2005, 2007, 2008, 2009, 2011, 2016
Seve Trophy (representing Continental Europe): 2000 (winners), 2002, 2003

See also
2002 PGA Tour Qualifying School graduates
2005 PGA Tour Qualifying School graduates
2006 PGA Tour Qualifying School graduates
2006 European Tour Qualifying School graduates
2014 Web.com Tour Finals graduates
2017 Web.com Tour Finals graduates
List of golfers with most Challenge Tour wins

References

External links
 
 
 
 
 
 
 
 

Czech male golfers
German male golfers
European Tour golfers
PGA Tour golfers
PGA Tour Champions golfers
Olympic golfers of Germany
Golfers at the 2016 Summer Olympics
Winners of senior major golf championships
Korn Ferry Tour graduates
People from Mariánské Lázně
Sportspeople from Munich
Sportspeople from Las Vegas
Czechoslovak emigrants to Germany
1970 births
Living people